Lyneham Primary School is a primary school in Canberra founded in 1959 located in the suburb of Lyneham. Lyneham and Downer Preschools nearby, are also run by the school. The school has an enrolment of some 515 students (as of 2018) and takes students from the school priority enrolment area of Lyneham, O'Connor, Downer, Turner, and Dickson area.

The school was opened in 1959 and, being a short distance from the historic Yass to Queanbeyan road, took students from both Canberra and nearby New South Wales villages.  In 1969 most of the school was destroyed by fire and classes were dispersed to nearby schools. The infants department returned to the school in late 1970 while the primary department returned in 1971. The fire was reviewed by the Australian Auditor-General, which led to criticisms of the standards of fire alarm installation in Commonwealth-controlled schools. By 1973, the Australian Parliament's Public Accounts Committee examined the outcomes of the fire for a second time, and indicated that the blaze had led Australian government departments to reclassify school buildings as special purpose buildings, commence installation of thermal fire protection systems in all schools, and examine suitable burglar alarm systems.

See also
 List of schools in the Australian Capital Territory
 Lists of schools in Australia
 Education in the Australian Capital Territory

References

 2008 School Self Assessment Report, ACT Department of Education, 2009

External links
 Lyneham Primary School website
 ACT Department of Education and Training
 Map of schools in the ACT

Public schools in the Australian Capital Territory
Primary schools in the Australian Capital Territory
Educational institutions established in 1959
1959 establishments in Australia
